The FAI Australian Grand Prix 2008 was the fifth qualifying Gliding Grand Prix for the FAI World Grand Prix 2008.

Gliding competitions
International sports competitions hosted by Australia
Gliding in Australia